Jonesboro is a city in Grant County, Indiana, United States, located along the Mississinewa River opposite Gas City. The population was 1,756 at the 2010 census. According to the 2010 census, Jonesboro had the third smallest population of a city in Indiana.

History
Jonesboro was established in 1837 by Obadiah Jones, and named for him.

Jonesboro is mentioned in season 1, episode 4 (Chapter 4: The Body) of the Netflix original show, Stranger Things, which is set in the fictional town of Hawkins, IN.

Geography
Jonesboro is located at  (40.479340, -85.629847).

City Government
The City is divided into 4 Wards, with a councilperson representing each ward and an additional councilperson at large. Citizens of Jonesboro also vote for their Clerk-Treasurer and City Attorney. The Mayor and the Council work together to govern the city.

Demographics

2010 census
As of the census of 2010, there were 1,756 people, 684 households, and 486 families living in the city. The racial makeup of the city was 97.7% White, 0.1% African American, 0.5% Native American, 0.6% from other races, and 1.2% from two or more races. Hispanic or Latino of any race were 2.4% of the population.

There were 684 households, of which 34.9% had children under the age of 18 living with them, 49.6% were married couples living together, 14.9% had a female householder with no husband present, 6.6% had a male householder with no wife present, and 28.9% were non-families. 23.8% of all households were made up of individuals, and 9.2% had someone living alone who was 65 years of age or older. The average household size was 2.57 and the average family size was 2.94.

The median age in the city was 39 years. 25.8% of residents were under the age of 18; 8.2% were between the ages of 18 and 24; 24.4% were from 25 to 44; 26.9% were from 45 to 64; and 14.9% were 65 years of age or older. The gender makeup of the city was 48.5% male and 51.5% female.

2000 census
As of the census of 2000, there were 1,887 people, 768 households, and 545 families living in the city. The racial makeup of the city was 97.51% White, 0.16% African American, 0.26% Native American, 0.05% Asian, 1.01% from other races, and 1.01% from two or more races. Hispanic or Latino of any race were 1.75% of the population.

There were 768 households, out of which 32.4% had children under the age of 18 living with them, 54.6% were married couples living together, 12.8% had a female householder with no husband present, and 29.0% were non-families. 25.0% of all households were made up of individuals, and 8.2% had someone living alone who was 65 years of age or older. The average household size was 2.46 and the average family size was 2.91.

In the city, the population was spread out, with 25.4% under the age of 18, 7.6% from 18 to 24, 29.4% from 25 to 44, 24.3% from 45 to 64, and 13.3% who were 65 years of age or older. The median age was 37 years. For every 100 females, there were 90.2 males. For every 100 females age 18 and over, there were 90.1 males.

The median income for a household in the city was $36,974, and the median income for a family was $42,036. Males had a median income of $33,611 versus $21,042 for females. The per capita income for the city was $16,723. About 4.1% of families and 6.5% of the population were below the poverty line, including 6.2% of those under age 18 and 5.6% of those age 65 or over.

Education
The city has a lending library, the Jonesboro Public Library. The city has two schools, one public and one private. Westview Elementary School is an Elementary school for students from Pre-School to 1st Grade and is a part of the Mississinewa School Corporation, which also features R.J. Baskett, Northview Elementary School, and Mississinewa High School in neighboring Gas City, Indiana. The King's Academy is a K-12 Christian school affiliated with the ACSI.

Notable people
John Harvey Baldwin, Minnesota state senator and lawyer
Harry Knight, Indy car driver
Mary Eleanor Spear, statistician

References

External links
 City of Jonesboro, Indiana website

Cities in Indiana
Cities in Grant County, Indiana